Stromberg is a German comedy television series. It is the German version of The Office.

Series overview

Episodes

Season 1 (2004)

Season 2 (2005)

Season 3 (2007)

Season 4 (2009)

Season 5 (2011–12)

External links

The Office
Lists of German television series episodes
Lists of comedy television series episodes